The 1988 Saguenay earthquake struck Quebec, Canada with a moment magnitude of 5.9 on November 25. It is one of the largest recorded earthquakes in eastern Canada and eastern North America during the 20th century. The earthquake was felt by millions, and damaged some buildings. It could be felt as far as Toronto, Halifax, and Boston.

The earthquake was triggered by faults associated with the Saguenay Graben.

See also
List of earthquakes in Canada

References

External links

1988 in Canada
1988
1988 earthquakes
History of Saguenay, Quebec
1988 in Quebec
Laurentides Wildlife Reserve

1988 disasters in Canada